Prey the Stars (known as Gabu Gabu Planet in Japan) is a video game for the Nintendo DS from Koei. The game was released on September 25, 2008 in Japan, October 10, 2008 in Europe and October 13, 2008 in North America.

Gameplay
In the game, players control various dog-like creatures in a competition to eat the most items in a given level. In order to successfully eat an item, players must repeatedly press the B button to "chew" that item.

Reception
The game received mixed reviews upon release. On Metacritic, the game holds a score of 66/100 based on 12 reviews.

References

External links
Prey the Stars official website
Prey the Stars press release

2008 video games
Action video games
Koei games
Nintendo DS games
Nintendo DS-only games
Video games developed in Japan